In Greek mythology, Calliope is the Muse who presides over eloquence and epic poetry; so called from the ecstatic harmony of her voice. Hesiod and Ovid called her the "Chief of all Muses".

Mythology
Calliope had two famous sons, Orpheus and Linus, by either Apollo or King Oeagrus of Thrace. She taught Orpheus verses for singing. According to Hesiod, she was also the wisest of the Muses, as well as the most assertive. Calliope married Oeagrus in Pimpleia, a town near Mount Olympus. She is said to have defeated the daughters of Pierus, king of Thessaly, in a singing match, and then, to punish their presumption, turned them into magpies.

In some accounts, Calliope is the mother of the Corybantes by her father Zeus.

She was sometimes believed to be Homer's muse for the Iliad and the Odyssey. The Roman epic poet Virgil invokes her in the Aeneid. In some cases, she is said to be the mother of Sirens by the river-god Achelous. Another account adds that Calliope bore Rhesus to the river-god Strymon.

Depictions

Calliope is usually shown with a writing tablet in her hand. At times, she is depicted carrying a roll of paper or a book, or wearing a gold crown. She is also depicted with her children.

The Italian poet Dante Alighieri, in his Divine Comedy, refers to Calliope:

American songwriter Bob Dylan dedicates the fourth verse of his 2020 song "Mother of Muses" to her: "I'm falling in love with Calliope / She doesn't belong to anybody - why not give her to me? / She's speaking to me, speaking with her eyes / I've grown so tired of chasing lies / Mother of Muses wherever you are / I've already outlived my life by far".

In the television programme The Sandman, Calliope was played by Melissanthi Mahut.

Honours
Calliope Beach in Antarctica is named after the nymph, as is the calliope hummingbird of North and Central America.

See also
 Muses in popular culture

Notes

References 

 Apollodorus, The Library with an English Translation by Sir James George Frazer, F.B.A., F.R.S. in 2 Volumes, Cambridge, MA, Harvard University Press; London, William Heinemann Ltd. 1921. . Online version at the Perseus Digital Library. Greek text available from the same website.
Apollonius Rhodius, Argonautica translated by Robert Cooper Seaton (1853-1915), R. C. Loeb Classical Library Volume 001. London, William Heinemann Ltd, 1912. Online version at the Topos Text Project.
 Apollonius Rhodius, Argonautica. George W. Mooney. London. Longmans, Green. 1912. Greek text available at the Perseus Digital Library.
 Euripides, The Rhesus of Euripides translated into English rhyming verse with explanatory notes by Gilbert Murray, LL.D., D.Litt., F.B.A., Regius Professor of Greek in the University of Oxford. Euripides. Gilbert Murray. New York. Oxford University Press. 1913. Online version at the Perseus Digital Library.
Euripides, Euripidis Fabulae. vol. 3. Gilbert Murray. Oxford. Clarendon Press, Oxford. 1913. Greek text available at the Perseus Digital Library.
Hesiod, Theogony from The Homeric Hymns and Homerica with an English Translation by Hugh G. Evelyn-White, Cambridge, MA.,Harvard University Press; London, William Heinemann Ltd. 1914. Online version at the Perseus Digital Library. Greek text available from the same website.
 Publius Ovidius Naso, Metamorphoses translated by Brookes More (1859-1942). Boston, Cornhill Publishing Co. 1922. Online version at the Perseus Digital Library.
 Publius Ovidius Naso, Metamorphoses. Hugo Magnus. Gotha (Germany). Friedr. Andr. Perthes. 1892. Latin text available at the Perseus Digital Library.
 Publius Vergilius Maro, Aeneid. Theodore C. Williams. trans. Boston. Houghton Mifflin Co. 1910. Online version at the Perseus Digital Library.
Publius Vergilius Maro, Bucolics, Aeneid, and Georgics. J. B. Greenough. Boston. Ginn & Co. 1900. Latin text available at the Perseus Digital Library.
Strabo, The Geography of Strabo. Edition by H.L. Jones. Cambridge, Mass.: Harvard University Press; London: William Heinemann, Ltd. 1924. Online version at the Perseus Digital Library.
 Strabo, Geographica edited by A. Meineke. Leipzig: Teubner. 1877. Greek text available at the Perseus Digital Library.

External links 
 
 CALLIOPE in The Theoi Project

Ancient Greek epic poetry
Children of Zeus
Greek Muses
Women of Apollo
Greek goddesses
Metamorphoses characters
Divine women of Zeus
Thraco-Macedonian mythology
Music and singing goddesses
Wisdom goddesses